Wublitz is a river of Brandenburg, Germany. It flows into the Großer Zernsee, which is drained by the Havel, near Werder (Havel).

See also
List of rivers of Brandenburg

Rivers of Brandenburg
Federal waterways in Germany
Rivers of Germany